The International Journal of Sexual Health is a peer-reviewed academic journal that covers research on sexual health as a state of physical, emotional, mental, and social well-being. It is the official journal of the World Association for Sexual Health. The editor-in-chief is Eli Coleman (University of Minnesota).

The journal was established in 1988 under the title Journal of Psychology & Human Sexuality.

References

External links 
 

Sexology journals
Taylor & Francis academic journals
Quarterly journals
Publications established in 1988
English-language journals
Reproductive health journals